Madhukar Balvantray Parekh is an Indian entrepreneur, Chairman of Pidilite Industries, a global company among the leaders in adhesives and sealants, construction chemicals, hobby colors. Madhukar is 16th richest Indian with a net worth of US$7.5 billion as of 2019.

Early years
Parekh is the son of Balvant Parekh, who founded Pidilite Industries in 1959. Parekh secured rank 4 in IIT JEE examination yet remained to study at UDCT. Madhukar completed Bachelor of Engineering in Chemical Engineering from the University Department of Chemical Technology of University of Mumbai and Masters in Chemical engineering from University of Wisconsin the United States in 1969. He joined Abbot Laboratories USA after his master's degree.

Parekh Joined family business Pidilite Industries in 1971

Awards & Recognitions
 Ranked 13 on Business Today Top 25 business leaders in India 2012
 Chemtech Business leader of the Year 2013
 EY Entrepreneur of the year - Consumer products 2014

Associations
Parekh serves as the chairman and managing director of Vinyl Chemicals India Limited, an Independent non executive director of Excel Industries Limited. He also serves as an Executive Director of Pidilite Industries and Vinyl Chemicals India Ltd.

References

Living people
Businesspeople from Mumbai
Indian billionaires
University of Mumbai alumni
Institute of Chemical Technology alumni
Indian industrialists
Gujarati people
University of Wisconsin–Madison College of Engineering alumni
Year of birth missing (living people)
Indian Jains